The Avon River is a perennial river of the West Gippsland catchment, located in the West Gippsland region, of the Australian state of Victoria. The Avon, forms an important part of the Latrobe sub-catchment, draining the south eastern slopes of the Great Dividing Range, to form the Gippsland Lakes.

Location and features
The Avon River rises on the south eastern slopes of Mount Wellington, below Miller Spur, part of the Great Dividing Range within the Avon Wilderness Park. The river descends  over its  course.

The upper reaches are contained in the rugged, heavily forested and largely inaccessible, Avon Wilderness Park. The river passes through forested hillsides, then cleared agricultural land.

Considerable demand is placed on the Latrobe and Thomson Rivers for supply of Melbourne's water, industrial use in Australia's largest pulp and paper mill and the power industry in the Latrobe Valley, and for irrigation. The Avon escapes any major impoundment or diversion.

The trail highlights the places of cultural significance to the first inhabitants across East Gippsland.

Etymology

At one point named the Avoca River by Thomas Mitchell, the river was named the Avon by Angus McMillan in circa 1840.

See also

List of rivers of Victoria

References

External links
 
 

West Gippsland catchment
Rivers of Gippsland (region)